Starwars is a 1977 board wargame published by Gamma Two Games.

Gameplay
Starwars is an abstract interstellar wargame in which the inhabitants of Sol and Vega attempt to capture each other's home systems.

Reception
Norman S. Howe reviewed Starwars in The Space Gamer No. 16. Howe reviewed both UFO and Starwars and commented that "They are attractively packaged and illustrated, and are made of sturdy materials. These are ideal games to play when you are too dazed to continue with War in the Pacific, or can't bear the sound of the pencils in Stellar Conquest."

References

Board games introduced in 1977